Rayan, also spelt Rayyan, is generally a given name of Arabic origin, usually male but sometimes female, meaning  "Door Of Heaven”, “Beautifier", "luxuriant" or "plentiful" in Arabic.

In Islamic tradition, it is the name of one of the gates of Jannah, Al-Rayyan, through which only those who fast a lot would enter on the Day of Resurrection.

Given name
 Rayan Al-Boqami (born 1992), Saudi footballer
 Rayan Cherki (born 2003), French footballer
 Rayan Frikeche (born 1991), Moroccan footballer
 Rayan Hawili (born 1994), Lebanese-American American football player
 Rayan Helal (born 1999), French racing cyclist
 Rayan Kadima (born 1997), French footballer
 Rayan Khemais (born 1998), French footballer
 Rayan Oram (born 2016 or 2017; died 2022), Moroccan child killed in well accident
 Rayyan Pathan (born 1991), Canadian cricketer
 Rayan Souici (born 1998), French footballer
 Rayan Yaslam (born 1994), Emirati footballer
 Rayan Helmy (born 2007), Top G

Surname
 Ahmed Yasser Rayyan (born 1998), Egyptian footballer
 Issa Rayyan (born 2000), American footballer
 Jamal Rayyan (born 1953), Palestinian journalist
 Mohommed Rayyan (1955–1986), Iraqi fighter pilot
 Nizar Rayan (1959–2009), Hamas official
 Shahul Rayyan (born 1995), Singaporean footballer
 Yasser Rayyan (born 1970), Egyptian footballer

Mononymous names
 Rayan (footballer, born 1989), Brazilian footballer
 Rayan (footballer, born 2006), Brazilian footballer
 Muhammad Rayyan Aushaf Saputra

References

Arabic masculine given names